Gábor Grebenár (born 17 August 1984 in Celldömölk) is a Hungarian handballer who plays for PLER KC as a left back.

Gábor participated at the 2008 European Men's Handball Championship, where he finished eighth with the Hungarian team.

Achievements
Nemzeti Bajnokság I:
Bronze Medalist: 2003, 2004, 2005, 2006, 2007, 2008, 2009
EHF Cup:
Semifinalist: 2003

References

External links
 Gábor Grebenár career statistics at Worldhandball

1984 births
Living people
People from Celldömölk
Hungarian male handball players
Expatriate handball players
Hungarian expatriate sportspeople in Spain
Hungarian expatriate sportspeople in France
Sportspeople from Vas County